Jane Harbour is a British violinist and composer, writing mainly for the group Spiro, which she formed in 1993. Her composition work has also included writing for theatre, live film and TV, and for other ensembles including the experimental project The Small Mammal Mirror.  Her orchestral work Kynde, a BBC Radio 3 commission, was performed live on Radio 3 by the BBC Concert Orchestra and the BBC Singers on 31 March 2017, conducted by Martin Yates.

References

Year of birth missing (living people)
Living people
Musicians from Bristol
English violinists
English composers
21st-century violinists